Travellin' Still...Always Will is a studio album released by Australian country music singer Slim Dusty and his daughter Anne Kirkpatrick. The album was released in March 2002, peaked at number 35 on the ARIA Charts and was certified gold.

Track listing

Charts

Weekly charts

Year-end charts

Certifications

Release history

References

Slim Dusty albums
2002 albums
EMI Records albums